Juan Carlos Cuminetti (born May 27, 1967) is a retired volleyball player from Argentina. He was a member of the men's national team that claimed the bronze medal in Seoul, South Korea, wearing the number #11 jersey.

References
Profile

1967 births
Argentine men's volleyball players
Argentine people of Italian descent
Living people
Olympic volleyball players of Argentina
Volleyball players at the 1988 Summer Olympics
Olympic bronze medalists for Argentina
Place of birth missing (living people)
Olympic medalists in volleyball
Medalists at the 1988 Summer Olympics
Pan American Games medalists in volleyball
Pan American Games bronze medalists for Argentina
Medalists at the 1991 Pan American Games
20th-century Argentine people
21st-century Argentine people